The Italian Basketball Federation is the governing body of basketball in Italy. It is based in Rome. 

It organises national competitions in Italy and the Italian basketball leagues, which operate the country's two professional leagues, Lega Basket Serie A (LBA) and Serie A2 Basket.

It is also responsible for appointing the management of the Italian national basketball team (men's) and women's. But also youth men's (under-19 and under-17), women's (under-19 and under-17), 3x3 men's and women's basketball teams.

It is a member of the International Basketball Federation (FIBA) as one of the founding member, and has one of the world's longest basketball traditions.

Competitions

The FIP also organizes several competitions:
 National cups:
 Italian LNP Cup
 Women's competitions:
 Serie A1 (women's basketball)

Sponsors

Source: FIP.it

See also
Italian National Basketball Team
Italian Cup
Italian Supercup
Italian Basketball Hall of Fame

References

External links 
 

Basketball in Italy
Basketball
Basketball governing bodies in Europe
Sports organizations established in 1921